Miriam Lifchitz Moreira Leite (Santos, 17 May 1926 - 17 February 2013) was a Brazilian sociologist, researcher, university professor and writer, winner of the Jabuti Award.

Miriam was among the first intellectuals in São Paulo to get involved in the fight for women's rights.

Biography
Born in Santos, in 1926, Miriam graduated in Social Sciences and History at the University of São Paulo, in 1944. She did a post-doctoral internship at the Eastman Foundation KODAK, and was one of the founders of the Center for Studies and Research on Women (NEMGE), in 1985, and since 1998 participated in the Visual Anthropology Group (GRAVI) at the University of São Paulo.

Miriam was the main researcher of Maria Lacerda de Moura's work, analyzing even her personal boxes and photo albums, and published the biographical study Outra cara do feminismo: Maria Lacerda de Moura. She continued to conduct historiographical research on Maria Lacerda, and published Maria Lacerda de Moura, uma feminista utópica in 2005.

In 1993, she published Retratos de Família, a book where she analyzes family photographs of immigrants who came to São Paulo between 1890 and 1930. This is her most widely read and awarded work, with which she won the Jabuti Award.

Personal life

Works

Awards 

References

External links
 Documentário: Caminhos da Memória – Miriam Moreira Leite
 Curta: Maria Lacerda de Moura: Trajetória de uma Rebelde

1926 births
2013 deaths
20th-century Brazilian women writers
Brazilian feminists
Brazilian sociologists
Brazilian women academics
People from Santos, São Paulo
Academic staff of the University of São Paulo